The black-faced coucal (Centropus melanops) is a species of cuckoo in the family Cuculidae. It is endemic to the Philippines. Its natural habitat is subtropical or tropical moist lowland forest.

References

black-faced coucal
Endemic birds of the Philippines
black-faced coucal
Taxonomy articles created by Polbot